Hiroshi Watanabe may refer to:

, Japanese animation director
, Japanese equestrian
, Japanese photographer
, Japanese weightlifter